Wyatt Miller (born October 23, 1995) is an American football offensive tackle who is a free agent. He played college football at the University of Central Florida.

Early years
Miller attended Coffee High School. As a junior, he played tight end and registered only one reception for 17 yards. As a senior, he was moved to offensive tackle and was selected to the All-Region first-team.

He lettered four years in baseball and one year in basketball. As a senior, he was a first baseman and hit for a .330 average, while receiving All-region honors.

College career
Miller accepted a football scholarship from the University of Central Florida. As a redshirt freshman, he appeared in 10 games, starting 8 contests at right tackle. As a sophomore, we was named the starter at right tackle and appeared in 13 games. As a junior, he started 13 games at right tackle. He was part of the team that went undefeated & was a National Champion.

As a senior, he was named the starter at left tackle and appeared in 13 games. He finished his college career after playing in 49 games with 47 starts.

Professional career

New York Jets
Miller was signed by the New York Jets as an undrafted free agent after the 2019 NFL Draft on May 10. He was waived on August 31.

Cincinnati Bengals
On September 2, 2019, he was signed to the Cincinnati Bengals' practice squad.

Dallas Cowboys
On December 24, 2019, he was signed by the Dallas Cowboys from the Cincinnati Bengals' practice squad, to take the roster spot of the injured Xavier Su'a-Filo. He was declared inactive in the season finale against the Washington Redskins. He was waived/injured by the Cowboys on September 2, 2020, and subsequently reverted to the team's injured reserve list the next day. He was waived a day later with an injury settlement.

Seattle Seahawks
On December 17, 2020, Miller was signed to the Seattle Seahawks' practice squad. He was released on January 5, 2021.

Kansas City Chiefs
On June 14, 2021, Miller signed with the Kansas City Chiefs. He was released on August 31, 2021.

San Francisco 49ers
On December 15, 2021, Miller was signed to the San Francisco 49ers.

Carolina Panthers
On May 16, 2022, the Carolina Panthers signed Miller. He was waived on August 14, 2022.

Cleveland Browns
On August 17, 2022, Miller signed with the Cleveland Browns. He was waived on August 22.

References

External links
UCF bio

1995 births
Living people
People from Douglas, Georgia
Players of American football from Georgia (U.S. state)
American football offensive tackles
UCF Knights football players
Cincinnati Bengals players
Dallas Cowboys players
Seattle Seahawks players
Kansas City Chiefs players
San Francisco 49ers players
Carolina Panthers players
Cleveland Browns players